Simple Gateway Monitoring Protocol (SGMP) defined in RFC 1028, allows commands to be issued to application protocol entities to set or retrieve values (integer or octet string types) for use in monitoring the gateways on which the application protocol entities reside.  Messages are exchanged using UDP and utilize unreliable transport methods.  Authentication takes place on UDP port 153.  Some examples of things that can be monitored are listed below.

Network Type for interfaces: IEEE 802.3 MAC, IEEE 802.4 MAC, IEEE 802.5 MAC, Ethernet, ProNET-80, ProNET-10, FDDI, X.25, Point-to-Point Serial, RPA 1822 HDH, ARPA 1822, AppleTalk, StarLAN
Interface Status (down, up, attempting, etc.)
Route Type (local, remote, sub-network, etc.)
Routing Protocol (RIP, EGP, GGP, IGRP, Hello)

The protocol was replaced by SNMP (Simple Network Management Protocol)

Sources
RFC 1028

Network protocols